James Edmund Davern, OAM, is an Australian television director, writer, script editor and producer, and founder of production company JNP Productions.

Professional career
Davern was employed as a writer and script editor with Australian Broadcasting Corporation (ABC) television branch in the 1960s. He worked as a producer and director in drama and music programmes and was involved in establishing a script production line.

In 1967, Davern was director and producer of the very first episode of Bellbird, Australia's first successful television soap opera, set in a rural community.

Davern moved to the Seven Network where he created the highly popular series A Country Practice, one of the most popular drama series in Australian television history. The series ran from 1981 to 1993 with 1,058 episodes. When the Seven Network cancelled A Country Practice in 1993, it was remade by Network 10 in 1994. Although James Davern moved to Network 10 to work on the "new" series. It was not a success  and was cancelled after 30 episodes.

Davern wrote episodes for Homicide, Alpha Scorpio, Rush, Patrol Boat, A Country Practice, and Warming Up. As producer or executive producer, he worked on shows such as Rush, Alpha Scorpio, Barnaby and Me, No Room to Run, Patrol Boat, A Country Practice, Queen of the Road, Warming Up, Hector's Bunyip, Land of Hope, Whipping Boy, The Hostages, Reprisal, Without Warning.

Awards and honours 
Davern was inducted into the Logies Hall of Fame in 1991 in recognition for his service to and influence on Australian television.

In 2014, Davern received an Order of Australia Medal (OAM) for service to television as a writer, director and producer. It's an Honour website

References

Further information
Moran, Albert (interviewer). "James Davern: Interviewed by Albert Moran." ScreenSound Australia: National Film and Sound Archive Oral History - Television collection. Record No: 273689

Australian television directors
Australian television writers
Australian television producers
Recipients of the Medal of the Order of Australia
Living people
Logie Award winners
Year of birth missing (living people)
Australian male television writers